The third SEA Games can be:
 1963 Southeast Asian Peninsular Games, supposedly held in Cambodia but later was cancelled.
 1965 Southeast Asian Peninsular Games, officially held in Kuala Lumpur, Malaysia.